Troy Kenneth "Ken" Cribb Jr. is a former presidential advisor to President Ronald Reagan.

Biography
Cribb was born August 7, 1948 in Spartanburg, South Carolina. His parents were T. Kenneth Cribb Sr. and Dicksie Brown Cribb. His father was an agribusinessman, merchandising and marketing expert, civic and religious leader, and a trustee of Clemson University. He is a doctor honoris causa of Universidad Francisco Marroquin.

Cribb graduated in 1970 from Washington and Lee University, and served as national director for ISI from 1971 to 1977. After that, he went on to University of Virginia Law School, graduating in 1980. He was deputy to the chief counsel of the Reagan campaign the same year. After working briefly as a Wall Street lawyer, he served as Assistant to the President for Domestic Affairs in the Reagan Administration, serving as President Reagan’s top advisor on domestic matters. Earlier in the administration he held the position of Counselor to the Attorney General.

He was president of the Intercollegiate Studies Institute from 1989-2011, and served on its board until May 2012. During his tenure, ISI expanded its  educational programs. He also served as vice chairman of the Fulbright Foreign Scholarship Board from 1989 to 1992. He was also president of the Collegiate Network, an association of alternative college newspapers; president of the Council for National Policy, a conservative umbrella organization; member of the board of advisors for the Foundation for Individual Rights in Education; is counselor to the Federalist Society for Law and Public Policy, a conservative legal organization. Cribb also serves on the board of advisors of the Russell Kirk Center for Cultural Renewal, an educational organization that continues the intellectual legacy of noted conservative icon Russell Kirk, and on the Board of Visitors of Ralston College, a start-up liberal arts college in Savannah. He also served as president of the Philadelphia Society.

Cribb has been published in National Review, The American Spectator, The Intercollegiate Review, Modern Age, and Human Events.

Heritage Foundation President, Edwin J. Feulner has stated that "the conservative movement had no better friend in the highest councils of state during the Reagan era than Ken Cribb".

Sources
T. Kenneth Cribb Jr.: All American Colleges. Top Schools for Conservatives, Old-fashioned Liberals, And People of Faith, ISI Books 2006.

References

External links
 Estuardo Zapeta: Interview with T. Kenneth Cribb Jr. New Media, UFM, Guatemala, November 18, 2005.
 T. Kenneth Cribb Jr.: The Founders and the Rising Generation Speech at the Philadelphia Society Meeting in Williamsburg, Virginia November 23, 1996.
 

1948 births
American activists
Assistants to the President of the United States
Living people
Reagan administration personnel
South Carolina Republicans
Washington and Lee University alumni
University of Virginia School of Law alumni
Federalist Society members